"One Toke Over the Line" is a song written and performed by American folk rock duo Brewer & Shipley.  It is a track from their 1970 LP Tarkio, and was released as their debut single in early 1971.

Background
Mike Brewer gives this account of the origin of the song, "One day we were pretty much stoned and all and Tom says, “Man, I’m one toke over the line tonight.” I liked the way that sounded and so I wrote a song around it."  

The song gained popular acclaim while the band was touring as an opening act for Melanie, after they received an encore but had run out of other songs to play.

In a 2012 interview, Brewer said "The president of the record company we were with at the time came backstage and said, “Oh man, you gotta record that and add it to the LP.” We were kind of like, “Really? Oh well, OK.” We didn’t even take the song seriously. Needless to say it came as a big surprise to us that they released it and not only that it was a big hit but it received so much controversy. The government came down on us." 

In 1971, the Federal Communications Commission issued guidance to radio station operators: "Whether a particular record depicts the dangers of drug abuse, or, to the contrary, promotes such illegal drug usage is a question for the judgment of the licensee.... Such a pattern of operation is clearly a violation of the basic principle of the licensee's responsibility for, and duty to exercise adequate control over, the broadcast material presented over his station. It raises serious questions as to whether continued operation of the station is in the public interest."

This had a chilling effect and some radio stations stopped playing popular songs like "One Toke Over the Line." Other stations played the songs even more frequently in protest.

Chart history
The song peaked at #10 on the U.S. Billboard Hot 100 and #8 Cash Box during the spring of 1971, and was the duo's only Top 40 hit.  It also reached #5 in Canada and #7 in New Zealand.

Weekly charts

Year-end charts

Cover versions
A cover version was performed in early 1971 by Gail Farrell and Dick Dale on The Lawrence Welk Show, which Welk billed as a "modern spiritual."

Later uses
The song is notably mentioned in the opening of Hunter S. Thompson's 1971 novel, Fear and Loathing in Las Vegas, and was "sung" by Dr. Gonzo (Benicio Del Toro) in the 1998 film of the same name. In the 2014 movie St. Vincent (film), the song "One Toke Over the Line" is heard playing on Bill Murray's headphones and is listed on the soundtrack credits.

See also
 List of 1970s one-hit wonders in the United States

References

External links
 
 Lawrence Welk Show version on YouTube

1970 songs
1971 singles
Songs about cannabis
Censorship of music
Kama Sutra Records singles